Donstadbakken (also: Donstadkleiva) was a K30 ski jumping hill located in Donstad, Morgedal, Norway where world record was set in 1897.

History 
On 25 January 1887, Svein Solid set the official world record on Donstadbakken at 31.5 metres (103.4 feet). 

On 25 February 1900, Aslak Solid made a world record distance jump at 36 metres (118 feet), but he crashed and it didn't count as record.

Ski jumping world records 

 Not recognized! Crash at world record distance.

References

External links
Donstadbakken (Donstatkleiva skisprungschanzen.com

Ski jumping venues in Norway